Dugda (also known as Deonagar) is a census town in the Chandrapura CD block in the Bermo subdivision of the Bokaro district in the state of Jharkhand, India. It is a small township, constructed during the 1970s, situated under the foot of several small hills. Residents of the township are primarily employees of Dugda Coal Washery under Bharat Coking Coal Limited (BCCL).

Geography

Location
It has an average elevation of 218 metres (715 feet).

Area overview
Bokaro district consists of undulating uplands on the Chota Nagpur Plateau with the Damodar River cutting a valley right across. The East Bokaro Coalfield located in the Bermo-Phusro area and small intrusions of Jharia Coalfield make Bokaro a coal rich district. In 1965, one of the largest steel manufacturing units in the country, Bokaro Steel Plant, operated by Steel Authority of India Limited, was set-up at Bokaro Steel City. The Damodar Valley Corporation established its first thermal power station at Bokaro (Thermal). The soil is generally infertile and agriculture is mostly rain-fed.

Note: The map alongside presents some of the notable locations in the district. All places marked in the map are linked in the larger full screen map.

Demographics
According to the 2011 Census of India, Dugda had a total population of 22,740, of which 11,912 (52%) were males and 10,828 (48%) were females. Population in the age range 0-6 years was 2,715. The total number of literate persons in Dugda was 15,794 (78.87% of the population over 6 years).

 India census, Dugda had a population of 18,864. Males constitute 54% of the population and females 46%. Dugda has an average literacy rate of 66%, higher than the national average of 59.5%: male literacy is 77% and, female literacy is 54%. In Dugda, 14% of the population is under 6 years of age.

Infrastructure
According to the District Census Handbook 2011, Bokaro, Dugda covered an area of 12.29 km2. Among the civic amenities, it had 13 km roads with both open and close drains, the protected water supply involved tap water from treated sources, hand pump, overhead tank. It had 3,838 domestic electric connections, 110 road lighting points. Among the medical facilities, it had 2 hospitals, 2 dispensaries, 2 health centres, 4 family welfare centers, 4 maternity and child welfare centers, 15 maternity homes, 4 nursing homes, 5 medicine shop. Among the educational facilities it had 18 primary school, 6 middle schools, 3 secondary schools, 2 senior secondary schools, 1 general degree college. It had 1 non-formal educational centre (Sarva Siksha Abhiyan). Among the social, recreational and cultural facilities it had 1 stadium, 4 auditorium/ community halls, 1 public library, 1 reading room. One important commodity it produced was coal. It had the branch office of 2 nationalised banks, 1 cooperative bank, 1 agricultural credit society, 4 non-agricultural credit societies.

Economy
Dugda Coal Washery of BCCL at Dugda has two units: Dugda I with annual capacity of 1 million tonnes per year washes non-coking coal, Dugda II with annual capacity of 2 million tonnes per year washes coking coal.

Place of interest
Khadeswari Temple - It is a famous temple for not only the people of Dugda but also for many other from other places. This place is also known as Pahari Mandir as it is situated on the top of the hill.

Milan Kendra - This is the marriage ceremony hall for the people.

Hanuman Mandir - There are three Hanuman Mandirs situated in the town. One in the middle of the market, second just below New B.C.C.L. Colony and the third one is in B.C.C.L Colony.

Shiva Mandir -There are two Shiva Mandir one temple is situated at the rear side of the main market and another one is in the middle of New B.C.C.L. Colony. It is the temple of Lord Shiva as the main deity, along with many other Hindu Gods.

Apart from these, there is also a Gurudwara and a Mosque.

Educational institutions
Schools
Pt Bageswari pandey Saraswati Shisu mandir Dugda, Bokaro
Saraswati Vidya Mandir Dugda-Basti, Bokaro
D.A.V Public school Dugda, Bokaro
Bal Vikas School Dugda, Bokaro
Vidya Sagar High School Dugda, Bokaro
High School Dugda, Bokaro
Sunrise Public School dugda, Bokaro

Gallery

References

External links

 Photos of Dugda
 Dugda facebook

Cities and towns in Bokaro district